Praia de Carquejinha  is a beach on the south coast of the island of Boa Vista in Cape Verde  Neighboring beaches are Praia de Santa Mónica to the west and Praia de Curral Velho to the east. The beach is about 8 km long.

See also
List of beaches of Cape Verde

References

Beaches of Cape Verde
Geography of Boa Vista, Cape Verde